Richa Sharma (born 29 August 1974) is an Indian film playback singer as well as a  devotional singer. In 2006, she sang Bollywood's longest track, the bidaai song, in film Baabul.

Career

Under the tutelage of Pandit Aaskaran Sharma, Richa went on to get proper training in Indian classical and light music. Richa added ghazals; film songs, Punjabi and Rajasthani folk songs to her repertoire, thus making her voice reach out to more and more people in a variety of sounds.

While music was at its peak in Richa's life, academic education had to be sacrificed and without any backing with a dream to make it big in the music world, Richa landed in Mumbai in 1994. She sang cover versions and bhajans to ensure she had her bread and butter and simultaneously continued her struggle in Bollywood. She made her debut in Bollywood with Sawan Kumar's Salma Pe Dil Aa Gaya in 1996 and followed it up by a number of films until the big hit came by in the form of Taal where she sang for A.R. Rahman.

Thereafter a spate of hits followed, Zubeidaa, Saathiya (A.R. Rahman); Hera Pheri (Anu Malik); Khakee (Ram Sampath); Tarkeeb (the song "Duppatte Ka Palu"), Baghban (Title Song for Aadesh Shrivastava); Soch (the song "Nikal Chali Be" for Jatin–Lalit); Rudraksh, Kal Ho Naa Ho (Sad version of the title track for Shankar–Ehsaan–Loy); Gangajal (Sandesh Shandilya); Popcorn Khao Mast Ho Jao (Vishal–Shekhar), Saawariya (Monty Sharma), and Om Shanti Om (Vishal–Shekhar) and the most popular song for Kaante ("Mahi Ve" for Anand Raaj Anand).

The versatile playback singer has also done quite a few albums to showcase her talent. Albums like Ni Main Yaar Nu Sajda Kardi, Piya and Winds of Rajasthan (for Times Music released early 2004) have brought out the class and grace in Richa's voice and her versatility as a singer.

In March 2011, Richa Sharma and her family inaugurated the Saibaba Temple in Faridabad, Haryana and launched her first Saibaba devotional album Sai Ki Tasveer released by SaReGaMa India...

Awards

|-
| 2003
| "Mahi Ve" (Kaante)
| Bollywood Movie Award for Best Female Playback Singer
| 
|-
|2010
| "Sajda" (My Name is Khan)
| Mirchi Music Award for Female Vocalist of The Year
|
|-
| 2011
| "Sajda" (My Name is Khan)
| Zee Cine Award for Best Female Playback Singer
| 
|}

Television
 She was the contestant on the NDTV Imagine singing reality show 'Dhoom Macha De'.
 She hosted Antakshari with Anu Kapoor on Zee TV.
 She appeared on the singing reality show Jo Jeeta Wohi Super Star as a guest judge.
 She also appeared on the singing reality show Indian Idol as a guest singer.
 She also appeared on the singing reality show Sa Re Ga Ma Pa Singing Superstar as a guest singer.
 She also appeared on Sai Baba: Maalik Ek Sue Anek 2011 aired on STAR One.
 She sang the title song for the STAR Plus show Sajda Tere Pyaar Mein.
 She sang the title song for the Sahara One show Doli Saja Ke.
 She sang the OST song for the HUM TV (PAKISTAN) Darama Yakeen ka Safar (Oh Mitti kay Parenday).
 On the Grand Finale from India's Got Talent season 4 she sang together with contestants Deepraj, Chanchal Bharti and Toshan.
 In 2014 Richa Sharma has sung a song with Shaan, Palak Muchhal penned by Raghvendra Singh music direction of Navin Manish for Rajshri Production's  TV show Mere rang mein rangne waali on Life Ok.
 On 28 January 2017, she appeared on "The Kapil Sharma Show" as guest.
 On 25 February 2017, Richa Sharma appeared on "Indian Idol" as guest.
 On 12 November 2018, Richa Sharma replaced Sona Mohapatra as the judge of Zee TV's Sa Re Ga Ma Pa 2018.
 She is currently one of the judges on the Zee Bangla singing reality show Sa Re Ga Ma Pa 2022.
 She also appeared on the singing reality show Indian Idol as a guest singer.

Discography

References

 Richa Sharma Discography

External links

 

1974 births
Living people
Bollywood playback singers
Indian women playback singers
Bhajan singers
Participants in Indian reality television series
People from Faridabad
Indian women classical singers
Singers from Haryana
Women musicians from Haryana
Zee Cine Awards winners
21st-century Indian women singers
21st-century Indian singers